Artotrogidae is a family of copepods in the order Siphonostomatoida.

Genera 
 Abyssopontius Stock, 1985
 Antarctopontius Eiselt, 1965
 Arctopontius Sars G.O., 1915
 Artogordion Ivanenko et al., 2018
 Artotrogus Boeck, 1859
 Ascidipontius Kim I.H., 1996
 Bradypontius Giesbrecht, 1895
 Cribropontius Giesbrecht, 1899
 Cryptopontius Giesbrecht, 1899
 Dyspontius Thorell, 1859
 Glannapontius Holmes, 1998
 Glyptotrogus McKinnon, 1988
 Metapontius Hansen, 1923
 Myzopontius Giesbrecht, 1895
 Neobradypontius Eiselt, 1961
 Neopontius Scott T., 1898
 Pseudotrogus Eiselt, 1961
 Pteropontius Giesbrecht, 1895
 Pulicitrogus Kim I.H., 1998
 Sestropontius Giesbrecht, 1899
 Sewellopontius Ummerkutty, 1966
 Tardotrogus Eiselt, 1961
 Thoostoma Wilson C.B., 1924 (taxon inquirendum, treated as a genus inquirendum by Boxshall & Halsey (2004))
 Altopontius Stock, 1985 accepted as Abyssopontius Stock, 1985
 Conostoma Thomson, 1883 accepted as Thoostoma Wilson C.B., 1924
 Dystrogus Giesbrecht, 1899 accepted as Artotrogus Boeck, 1859
 Gallopontius Giesbrecht, 1895 accepted as Dyspontius Thorell, 1859
 Urogonia Brady, 1910 accepted as Bradypontius Giesbrecht, 1895

References 

 Boxshall, G. (2001). Copepoda (excl. Harpacticoida), in: Costello, M.J. et al. (Ed.) (2001). European register of marine species: a check-list of the marine species in Europe and a bibliography of guides to their identification. Collection Patrimoines Naturels, 50: pp. 252–268

External links 
 
 
 at World Register of Marine Species (WoRMS)

Siphonostomatoida
Crustacean families